Guryong Falls (lit. Nine Dragon Falls, Korean: 구룡폭포-소금강)  is a group of nine waterfalls located on Sogeumgang River in the Odaesan National Park in South Korea.

References

Waterfalls of South Korea